The Human Demands is the fifth studio album by Scottish singer-songwriter Amy Macdonald, and was released on 30 October 2020. The album includes the singles "The Hudson", "Crazy Shade of Blue", "Fire" and "Statues". That same day, Macdonald's official website and official Instagram profile confirmed the album for release.

Background
In an interview with Wonderland, Macdonald said, "It's an album about life and the ups and downs that come with it. It's never easy for anyone and I don't think we give ourselves enough credit sometimes. We're just expected to constantly be going 100mph all the time and that can be demanding for anyone. I wanted the album title to reflect the reality of life for the majority of people. [...] Myself, my producer Jim and all the wonderful musicians were just excited to be making music again. We felt genuinely lucky to be in the position that we could have a bit of normality back in our lives." After the release of the album, Macdonald said on her Instagram account, "I hope this album can be a comfort in these turbulent times. I am extremely proud of it. It feels like a special record coming out at an important time. Thank you so much for all your support over the past 15 years. I wouldn't be anything without you."

Promotion

Singles
"The Hudson" was released as the lead single from the album on 27 August 2020. The song peaked at number 12 on the Scottish Singles Chart. The song also charted in Belgium. "Crazy Shade of Blue" was released as the second single off the album on 25 September 2020. The title track, "The Human Demands", was released as a promotional single on 27 October 2020. "Fire" was released as the third single off the album on 4 December 2020. "Statues" was released as the fourth single from the album on 19 February 2021.

Tour
On 7 September 2020, Macdonald announced her UK and Europe tour on her social media profiles. The tour had to be 
rescheduled due to the COVID-19 pandemic.

Track listing
Credits adapted from Tidal.

Personnel
Credits adapted from Tidal.
 Eddd Hartwell – Engineer
 Ruadhri Cushnab – Engineer
 Barry Barnicott – Engineer
 Alex Di Camillo – Engineer
 Dick Beetham – Engineer
 Giovanni Giagu – Engineer

Charts

Weekly charts

Year-end charts

Release history

References

2020 albums
Amy Macdonald albums